Oswaldo Jesús León Montoya (born 15 June 1999) is a Mexican professional footballer who plays as a centre-back.

International career
In April 2019, León was included in the 21-player squad to represent Mexico at the U-20 World Cup in Poland.

Career statistics

Club

References

1999 births
Living people
Mexican footballers
Mexico youth international footballers
Association football defenders
Club América footballers
Club Atlético Zacatepec players
Ascenso MX players
Liga Premier de México players
Tercera División de México players
Footballers from Guanajuato